The Republic of Poland Ambassador to the United States (known formally as the Ambassador Extraordinary and Plenipotentiary of the Republic of Poland to the United States) is the official representative of the Government of the Republic of Poland to the Government of the United States.

History
The first permanent Polish diplomatic mission was created in late 18th century by the last king of Poland, Stanislaus Augustus. After partitions of Poland, there was over a century gap in diplomatic relations. The mission was re-established following Poland regaining independence in the aftermath of World War I.

Ambassadors of Poland to the United States

Second Polish Republic
Note: Second Republic was created in 1918.

 1919–1922: Kazimierz Lubomirski (envoy)
 1923–1925: Władysław Wróblewski (envoy)
 1925–1929: Jan Ciechanowski (envoy)
 1929–1932: Tytus Filipowicz (Ambassador beginning in 1930)
 1932–1933: Władysław Sokołowski (as chargé d'affaires)
 1933–1935: Stanisław Patek
 1935–1936: Władysław Sokołowski (as chargé d'affaires)
 1936–1940: Count Jerzy Antoni Potocki
 1940–1945: Jan Ciechanowski
 1945–1945: Janusz Żółtowski (as chargé d'affaires)

Polish People's Republic
Note: Officially, Polish People's Republic is the name used since 1952. Unofficially, this name is used for all Polish communist governments since 1944.

 1945–1947 – Oskar Lange
 1947–1955 – Józef Winiewicz
 1955–1961 – Romuald Spasowski
 1961–1967 – Edward Drożniak
 1967–1972 – Jerzy Michałowski
 1972–1977 – Witold Trąmpczyński
 1978–1982 – Romuald Spasowski
 1982–1988 – Zdzisław Ludwiczak (as chargé d’affaires)
 1988–1990 – Jan Kinast

Third Polish Republic
Note: modern Poland.

 1990–1993: Kazimierz Dziewanowski
 1993–1994: Maciej Kozłowski (as chargé d'affaires)
 1994–2000: Jerzy Koźmiński
 2000–2005: Przemysław Grudziński
 2005–2007: Janusz Reiter
 2008–2012: Robert Kupiecki
 2012–2016: Ryszard Schnepf
 2016–2021: Piotr Wilczek
 since 2021: Marek Magierowski

References

See also
List of ambassadors of the United States to Poland
Poland–United States relations

 
United States
Poland